Kohsuke Hirata (born May 1, 1992 in Tokoro, Hokkaido, Japan) is a Japanese curler, a . He currently skips his own team out of Kitami.

He participated in the 2018 Winter Olympics, where the Japanese men's team finished in eighth place.

Teams

References

External links

 2018 Winter Olympics profile (web archive)
 2015 Winter Universiade profile
 2017 Winter Universiade profile

Living people
1992 births
Japanese male curlers
Olympic curlers of Japan
Curlers at the 2018 Winter Olympics
Competitors at the 2015 Winter Universiade
Competitors at the 2017 Winter Universiade
Pacific-Asian curling champions
Asian Games medalists in curling
Curlers at the 2017 Asian Winter Games
Medalists at the 2017 Asian Winter Games
Asian Games silver medalists for Japan
21st-century Japanese people